Fiend Without a Face is a 1958 independently made British black-and-white science fiction-horror film drama from Amalgamated Productions. It was produced by John Croydon and Richard Gordon, directed by Arthur Crabtree, and stars Marshall Thompson, Kynaston Reeves, Michael Balfour, and Kim Parker. The film was released in the U.K. by Eros Films; in the U.S. it was released in June 1958 by MGM as a double feature with The Haunted Strangler.

Fiend Without a Face tells the story of mysterious deaths at the hands of a mentally created invisible life form that feeds on atomic power and then steals human brains and spinal columns to use as bodies in order to multiply its numbers.

The screenplay by Herbert J. Leder was based upon Amelia Reynolds Long's 1930 short story "The Thought Monster", originally published in the March 1930 issue of Weird Tales magazine.

Plot
U. S. Air Force Interceptor Command Experimental Station No. 6 is a long-range radar installation located in rural Winthrop, Manitoba, Canada. Unexplained deaths begin to occur in the general area of a farming village near the American base. Postmortems reveal the victims were murdered and the brains and spinal cords are missing from the corpses; the only clue left behind are two puncture marks at the base of each skull. The locals, however, become convinced that radiation leaks from the radar installation's nuclear-power experiments are the cause of the mysterious deaths.

Air Force Major Jeff Cummings (Thompson) begins an investigation as the local deaths continue, interviewing various townsfolk, while looking for anything unusual. Cummings becomes suspicious of Professor R. E. Walgate (Reeves), a retired British scientist living near the airbase; Walgate is in the process of writing another book about his ongoing experiments with telekinesis, this time as it applies to thought projection. Major Cummings' suspicion of Walgate is later proved to be correct. The scientist finally admits he has not only succeeded in developing his mental ability, but in the process created a living thought projection. Unknown to Professor Walgate, the nuclear power radar experiments underway at the nearby U. S. airbase have greatly enhanced his mental abilities to the point that, through him, his living thought projection has become a malevolent and invisible new life form. It escaped from Walgate's laboratory and is now attacking humans as a means of replicating physical, though still invisible, new versions of itself, all of which are now feeding on the base's nuclear-generated power.

The invisible creatures eventually attack and kill the military personnel at the airbase in order to take over control of the radar station's nuclear reactor; two of them dial-up the power to very dangerous levels. As they do so all the creatures suddenly become visible. Their now visible bodies are revealed to be the missing brains with spinal cords stolen from their victims; their spinal cords have become very flexible and have now sprouted tendrils. These mutations also allow the brain-spine creatures to move quickly and even leap distances; each brain-spine has also developed a pair of small eyes at the ends of extended eye stalks.

The slithering creations then attack Walgate's home, where most of the film's principal characters have gathered to discuss the crisis. Some of the brains get inside by breaking through a boarded-up window using their tendrils, while others leap to the roof and slither down through the fireplace's open flue. Some of the defenders are attacked and killed, but well-aimed .45 semi-automatic pistol shots to the brains soon make short work of most of the attacking creatures; they gorily bleed out as they expire.

Walgate exits his home as a diversion, but is quickly attacked and killed by his creation. Meanwhile, Major Cummings escapes out the back way and quickly heads to the airbase, where he saves the day by blowing up the radar installation's power machinery. This immediately robs the surviving brains of their high-energy food source, and the creatures quickly die, dissolving into puddles of goo.

Cast
 Marshall Thompson as Major Jeff Cummings
 Kynaston Reeves as Professor R. E. Walgate
 Michael Balfour as Sergeant Kasper
 Kim Parker as Barbara Griselle
 Terry Kilburn as Captain Al Chester
 Gil Winfield as Dr. Warren, M.D.
 Shane Cordell as Nurse
 Stanley Maxted as Colonel G. Butler
 James Dyrenforth as Mayor Hawkins
 Kerrigan Prescott as Peterson
 Meadows White & Lala Lloyd as Ben & Amelia Adams
 Robert MacKenzie as Const. Gibbons

Production and release

Noted science fiction personality, collector, and literary agent Forrest J Ackerman represented mystery and science fiction pulp writer Long and brokered the sale of her story "The Thought Monster" to the film's producers.

Screenwriter Leder was originally set to direct the film, but being American, was unable to obtain a British work permit in time, so Crabtree replaced him as director. Thompson later said that when the director showed up on the first day of shooting and looked at the script, Crabtree claimed it was not the film he had been hired to direct, as he did not do "monster" films. After a heated argument with the producers, Crabtree left the set and did not show up for several days. In the interim, Thompson himself directed the film.

Fiend Without a Face was made entirely in England. Its Canadian setting was chosen because it would appeal to both American and British Commonwealth movie audiences, while still being easy to replicate using the English shooting locations. U. S. Air Force stock aviation footage was also used to establish the military base setting and to pad out the film's meager running time. The producers used primarily expatriate American and Canadian actors working in the United Kingdom, plus a few British actors dubbed by Americans.

The film's visible brain creatures were created using stop-motion animation, an unusual practice for such a low-budget science fiction thriller of this era. The director of these effects sequences was Florenz Von Nordoff, while the actual stop-motion was done in Munich by Nordhoff's partner, German special effects artist K. L. Ruppel. Peter Neilson headed up the British practical effects crew.

During July 1958, Fiend Without a Face first opened in the United States at the Rialto Theatre in New York City's Theater District. The film's producers placed an outdoor, front-of-the-house exhibit near the sidewalk that showcased a "living and breathing Fiend" in a steel-barred glass display case. It periodically moved its spinal cord tail, startling onlookers, and also made menacing sounds with the help of a concealed electrical device. The crowds that gathered to watch the caged Fiend grew so large that NYC police finally ordered the display case removed because it was creating a public disturbance.

Five months later, Fiend Without a Face created a public uproar after its British premiere at the Ritz Theatre in Leicester Square in London's West End. The British Board of Film Censors had demanded a number of cuts before its release and finally granted the film an "X" certificate, but newspaper critics were still aghast at its horrifying special effects. Questions were actually raised in Parliament as to why British censors had allowed Fiend Without a Face to be released, notably: "What is the British film industry thinking by trying to beat Hollywood at its own game of overdosing on blood and gore".

Reception

A reviewer for Harrison's Reports wrote in May 1958, "Up until the last two reels, this British-made science-fiction-horror program horror melodrama is fairly interesting in the usual fantastic sort of way, because it deals with unexplained, invisible monsters who strangle their victims and supposedly suck out their brains and spinal cords. During the final fifteen minutes, however, the picture, instead of being mystifying or horrifying, is just plain revolting, to an extent that even those with strong stomachs may not be able to take it ... Because of its excessive gore, the picture is too unpalatable to be classified as entertainment." In contrast, a reviewer for Motion Picture Daily in June 1958 wrote, "This entry in the science fiction, horror division sweepstakes is well and logically constructed, capably acted and directed with an eye toward building suspense. The cast is substantially unknown but exploitation of the horror angle is indicated and should be effective."

Later reviews concentrated on the low production values and lack of a cohesive plot, but with a 67% "Fresh" rating at the review aggregator website Rotten Tomatoes, Fiend Without a Face now is considered one of the best B movies of the 1950s. James Rolfe called the film the "best killer brain movie ever" and stated that "it may be the goriest film of its time". Leonard Maltin noted the film's "horrific climax, [and] good special effects." Marcella Papandrea of The Super Network said, "While the film gets off to a bit of a rocky start, it finds its footing fairly quickly though and it becomes quite immersive and intense."

Box office
According to MGM records, Fiend Without a Face was released on a double bill with The Haunted Strangler. Together, the two films earned $350,000 in the United States and Canada, and $300,000 in England and elsewhere. The estimated production budget for Fiend Without a Face was £50,000 ($,000); MGM realized a profit of $160,000 on the movie.

While Fiend Without a Face was not a major hit, it was one of the more successful British films released in the U.S. in 1958. Unexpectedly, it performed better in the South, Midwest, and California than in the Northeast, where U.K. imports were usually more well-received. MGM was also surprised by market research showing Fiend Without a Face to be a "stronger draw by far" than its companion release, The Haunted Strangler, which failed to generate much audience interest.

Remakes
On 22 March 2010, Roy Frumkes confirmed to Fangoria magazine that he planned to produce a remake of the film in 2011.

The online website Dread Central offered an October 2013 update from Frumkes on his Fiend Without a Face remake:

The website also posted a still from a fundraising trailer that Frumkes had shot for the remake with director Franco Frassetti. As of January 2019, that remake has yet to materialize.

Montreal-based filmmaker Rémi Fréchette produced, co-wrote and directed a web series (2013) and a horror comedy feature film (2014), both called Les Jaunes, which shared the themes and images of Fiend Without a Face, including the military aspects, rural setting, and energy-based brain creatures. In Les Jaunes, an epidemic of yellow crawling brains threatens the lives of the inhabitants of Fort Vince, a reclusive Northern Quebec town.

Home media
The Criterion Collection, a video company known for its painstaking restorations of various film classics, released a deluxe DVD edition of Fiend Without a Face in 2007, having previously released it on LaserDisc.

A high-definition video transfer, created on a Spirit DataCine from a 35 mm film print, was struck from the film's original negative. Thousands of pieces of dirt, debris and scratches were removed using the MTI Digital Restoration System. For optimal image quality, Criterion also encoded the dual-layer DVD-9 at the highest possible bit rate. The film's original monaural soundtrack was remastered at 24-bit, and audio restoration tools were used to eliminate clicks, pops, hisses and crackles.

Criterion added these bonus DVD features to their release:
 A new widescreen 1.66: 1 transfer with a complete digital picture restoration enhanced for 16×9 hi-def televisions.
 Audio commentary: a conversation with executive producer Gordon and genre film writer Tom Weaver.
 An illustrated essay on British science fiction/horror film making by film historian Bruce Eder.
 A collection of movie trailers from various Gordon films: Fiend without a Face, The Haunted Strangler, Corridors of Blood, First Man into Space and The Atomic Submarine.
 Rare still photographs and ephemera, with audio commentary.
 Vintage advertisements and lobby cards.
 New English subtitles for the deaf and hearing impaired.
 A new DVD cover art design by David Cohen.

Notes

References

Bibliography

 Maltin, Leonard. Leonard Maltin's Movie Guide 2009. New York: New American Library, 2009 (originally published as TV Movies, then Leonard Maltin's Movie & Video Guide), First edition 1969, published annually since 1988. .
 Warren, Bill. Keep Watching the Skies, American Science Fiction Movies of the 50s, Vol II: 1958–1964. Jefferson, North Carolina: McFarland & Company, 1986. . Warren's original double-volume work was revised and new material added, including a foreword by Texas science fiction writer Howard Waldrop. It was reprinted in 2009 by McFarland as a single, oversized hardcover "21st Century" volume of 1040 pages.
 Weaver, Tom. The Horror Hits of Richard Gordon. Albany, Georgia: Bear Manor Media, 2011. .

External links

 
 
 
 Fiend Without a Face an essay by Bruce Kawin at the Criterion Collection

1958 films
1958 horror films
1950s science fiction films
1950s science fiction horror films
British science fiction films
Films directed by Arthur Crabtree
Films using stop-motion animation
British monster movies
Mad scientist films
Films set in Manitoba
Films based on science fiction short stories
Films about invisibility
1950s monster movies
1950s independent films
Obscenity controversies in film
1950s English-language films
1950s British films